The 2019 KNSB Dutch Allround Championships in speed skating were held in Heerenveen at the Thialf ice skating rink from 26 January to 27 January 2019. The tournament was part of the 2018–2019 speed skating season. Douwe de Vries and Carlijn Achtereekte won the allround titles.

Schedule

Medalists

Allround

Distance

Classification

Men's allround

Women's allround

Source:

References

KNSB Dutch Allround Championships
KNSB Dutch Allround Championships
2019 Allround
KNSB Dutch Allround Championships, 2019
January 2019 sports events in the Netherlands
2010s in Amsterdam